Yesunte Möngke or, Yesunte Möngke Barlas (Mongol: Есүнтэ Мөнх, Есүнтэ Мөнх Барлас ; died 13th Century) was a Mongol military commander, and son of Qarachar Barlas (1166–1256) who was founder of Barlas and brother of Ichil who was ancestor of Timur, the founder of Timurid empire, Yesunte was the great-grandfather of Hajji Barlas the Barlas Mongol leader.

13th-century Mongolian people
Medieval military leaders

Life 

Yesunte Möngke was majorly mentioned around 1200s A.D. he was the son of Qarachar who was Borjigid Prince and Timur traced paternal ancestry to him, at the background Khamag Mongol Confederation was ended, and Genghis Khan founding Mongol empire to uniting all the tribes after Genghis Khan established Genghisid dynasty, Yesunte Möngke lineages no more claim descent from royal clan Borjigids because of Barlas tribe creation and knowing as himself as Barlas Mongol the branch from borjigins but inferiors to Genghisids for nobility, but after Barlas Clan rise to power against weak Chagatai rules like his descent Saif al-din and Timur personalities Barlas becoming Dynasty as Link through Timurids.

References 

Barlas

13th-century deaths
Year of birth unknown
Year of death unknown